Velia is a genus of aquatic bugs in the family Veliidae.

Species
 Velia caprai (Tamanini, 1947)
 Velia currens (Fabricius, 1794)
 Velia helenae
 Velia saulii

References

Veliidae
Gerromorpha genera